Jason Crookes (born ) is an English rugby league footballer who plays as a  or er for the Sheffield Eagles in the Betfred Championship.

Background
Crookes was born in Huddersfield, West Yorkshire, England.

Bradford
Crookes played junior rugby for Newsome in Huddersfield before signing for the Bradford Bulls in 2007. He was loaned out to Widnes Vikings for the 2008 season.

2009 season
Crookes made his Super League début against Hull in Round 5. His next appearance would be the win over local rivals Leeds Rhinos where he was on the subs bench and his final game in 2009 he again started at Centre against Wakefield Trinity Wildcats.

2010 season
Crookes appeared in all four pre-season friendlies.

Crookes first game of 2010 was against Wigan Warriors in place of the injured Rikki Sheriffe. He also played against Crusaders in the Magic Weekend. His next league appearance would be in Round 25 (St. Helens) then in Round 26 against Wakefield Trinity. He also played in the Challenge Cup tie against the Dewsbury Rams. At the end of the season Jason Crookes signed a new 2-year contract to stay with the Bradford Bulls.

2011 season
Crookes featured in three of the four pre-season games. He played against Halifax, Dewsbury and Keighley. Jason scored a try against Halifax. He was then sent on dual-registration with Championship side Sheffield Eagles.

Crookes appeared in six consecutive games from Round 15 (Salford City Reds) to Round 20 (Catalans Dragons). He hs not featured in any more league or cup games.

2012 season
Crookes featured in three of the four pre-season friendlies. He played against Castleford Tigers, Dewsbury and Hull. Jason scored a try against Castleford and another against Hull.

Jason featured in nine consecutive games from Round 1 (Catalans Dragons) to Round 9 (Hull). He was injured from Round 10–22 and Round 4–5 in the Challenge Cup. He featured in Round 24 (Hull Kingston Rovers) to Round 27 (Catalans Dragons). Crookes scored against Wigan (1 try), Warrington Wolves (1 try), Hull Kingston Rovers (4 tries) and Hull (1 try).

Hull
On 19 September, Hull FC announced they had signed Crookes on a three-year deal.

2013 season
Crookes featured in three consecutive games from Round 1 (Leeds) to Round 3 (St Helens). Jason was injured from Round 4 to Round 7. Crookes featured in Round 8 (London Broncos). Jason played in Round 10 (Wakefield Trinity) and then again in Round 12 (Salford). He did not feature again until Round 18 (Catalans Dragons) to Round 19 (Castleford). Jason's next game was Round 25 (Salford) to Round 27 (St Helens). Jason featured in the playoffs against Catalans Dragons and Huddersfield Giants. Crookes also featured in the Challenge Cup against North Wales Crusaders, and in the Final against Wigan. He scored against the Bradford Bulls (1 try), St. Helens (1 try) and Wigan (3 tries).

2014 season
Crookes featured in Round 11 (Wakefield Trinity) to Round 13 (Hull Kingston Rovers). He was released from the final year of his contract at the end of the season.

Statistics

References

1990 births
Living people
Batley Bulldogs players
Bradford Bulls players
Dewsbury Rams players
English rugby league players
Featherstone Rovers players
Hull F.C. players
Rugby league centres
Rugby league players from Huddersfield
Rugby league wingers
Sheffield Eagles players
Widnes Vikings players
York City Knights players